Honzovo království (Jack's Kingdom) is a 1934 Czech opera in 3 acts by Otakar Ostrčil to a libretto by  based on Tolstoy's short story "Tale of Ivan the Jester".

Recordings
Honzovo království complete Ivo Žídek, Jaroslava Vymazalová, Přemysl Kočí, Prague Symphony Orchestra, Václav Jiráček 1954, reissued Supraphon.

References

Operas
1934 operas
Czech-language operas
Operas based on works by Leo Tolstoy